The , signed as Route C2, is one of the routes of the Shuto Expressway system serving the central part of the Greater Tokyo Area. The route is a circumferential highway running through the outer wards of Tokyo. The route is the middle of four ring expressways planned for the city; the other three being the C1 Inner Circular Route, the C3 Tokyo Gaikan Expressway, and the C4 Ken-Ō Expressway.

Route description

The Yamate Tunnel forms a key part of the Central Circular Route. A deep tunnel constructed beneath Yamate Dori, the first section over 11 km in length, was opened to traffic on 22 December 2007. From 2010, the tunnel extended the Central Circular Route south from near Ikebukuro to Ohashi Junction connecting with Route 3. The last  through Meguro and Shinagawa was opened to traffic on 7 March 2015. When this last section of the tunnel opened the Yamate Tunnel formed Japan's longest, and the world's second longest road tunnel. During the tunnel's first week of operations, traffic volume on the Inner Circular Route was reduced by seven percent from the previous week, and congestion on expressways inside the Central Circular Route (an index measured by recording segments where average traffic speed is less than 40 km/h, and multiplying the affected distance by the affected time) was approximately halved from the previous week.

The C2 begins and ends at the Bayshore Route, which serves to close the southeastern part of the loop.

History
The first section of the Central Circular Route was opened to traffic on 30 March 1982. Since then, the expressway was completed in phases. Construction work on underground sections of the route began in 1992. Given the extensive tunneling and engineering challenges involved, construction costs for the route were estimated to be 2 trillion yen. The Central Circular Route was completed on 7 March 2015.

Exit list

List of currently existing interchanges and exits ordered following the outer loop (clockwise):

References

C2
1982 establishments in Japan
Ring roads in Japan
Roads in Tokyo